Divyaa Unni is an American actress and classical dancer of Indian origin who teaches various forms of dance such as Bharathanatyam, Kuchipudi and Mohiniyattom.

Early life
Divyaa Unni was born to Ponnethmadhatil Unnikrishnan and Kizhkemadhatil Uma Devi at Kochi, Kerala, India. Her mother Uma Devi, is a Sanskrit teacher and is the Head of Sanskrit Department; at Bhavans Vidya Mandir, Girinagar & was awarded the National Award for Teachers (India), in the year 2013 by the President of India Shri Pranab Mukherjee. She has a sister, Vidhya Unni, who has worked as a lead in couple of Malayalam movies. Divyaa completed her schooling in Bhavan's Vidya Mandir, Girinagar.

She graduated with a bachelor's degree in Communicative English from St. Teresa's College, Ernakulam. Divyaa is related (cousin) to Malayalam actress Meera Nandan and Remya Nambeesan.

The actress has two children in her first marriage.

Film career

Divyaa has acted as a lead in over 50 films in Malayalam, Tamil, Telugu and Kannada.

As a child, Divyaa got her first break in the film Neeyethra Dhanya (1987) when she was a student in second grade. It was followed by Pookkalam Varavayi (1991) directed by Kamal and O' Faby (1993). She also did a TV serial Iniyonnu Vishramikkatte directed by Vinayan.

Divyaa's first feature film as a lead actress was Kalyana Sowgandhikam (1996) with actors like Dileep and Kalabhavan Mani in the lead roles - one she did when she was fourteen; studying in the tenth grade. Subsequently, she worked with the actors Mammootty, Mohanlal, Suresh Gopi, Jayaram and Dileep and directors Bharathan; I V Sasi; Sibi Malayil and Lohithadas.

Dance career

Divyaa started her Bharatanatyam dance training at the age of three, thereafter she was trained in Kuchipudi, and Mohiniyattam. Subsequently, Divyaa Unni was crowned, in 1990 and 1991, ''Kalathilakom'' in Kerala School Kalolsavam   statewide competitions. On India's premier Television Channel Doordarshan, she has presented a variety of Indian dance art-forms to such as Bharatanatyam, Kuchipudi, Mohiniyattam, and Indian folk dance. She continues to perform at various Indian dance festivals in India and international stages throughout North America, Europe and Persian Gulf countries.

She has received many awards including the Aravindaksha Memorial Award – the Abhinaya Tilaka Puraskaram for the best state dance performance.

In the pursuit of promoting Indian culture in the West, Divyaa is developing the artistic talents of young children in the United States, where she currently resides. With this goal, she is currently the Director of Sreepadam School of Arts in Houston, Texas, United States.

Filmography

Television

 Serials
 Neeyum Njanum (Zee Keralam)
 Iniyonnu Vishramikkate (DD Malayalam)
 Shankupushpam (Asianet)
 Kunjikkoonan (DD Malayalam)
 Manassu (DD Malayalam)

 Telefilm 
 Pranayam (Surya TV)

TV shows as Host
 American Jalakam (Asianet)
 Asianet Film Awards (Asianet)
 America Today (Kairali TV)
 Pravaham
 Poomottukal (DD Malayalam)

TV shows as Judge
Comedy Stars Season 3 (Asianet)
Top singer season 2 (Flowers TV)
 Oru Chiri Iruchiri Bumper Chiri (Mazhavil Manorama)

References

External links

 
 
 

Living people
20th-century American dancers
20th-century Indian actresses
20th-century Indian dancers
20th-century Indian educators
20th-century Indian women artists
20th-century women educators
21st-century Indian actresses
Actresses from Kochi
Actresses in Kannada cinema
Actresses in Malayalam cinema
Actresses in Malayalam television
Actresses in Tamil cinema
Actresses in Telugu cinema
Bharatanatyam exponents
Child actresses in Malayalam cinema
Dancers from Kerala
Educators from Kerala
Indian dance teachers
Indian film actresses
Indian television actresses
Kuchipudi exponents
Teachers of Indian classical dance
Women artists from Kerala
Women educators from Kerala
St. Teresa's College alumni
Year of birth missing (living people)